Charles III's Departure for Spain, Seen from the Land is a 1759 oil on canvas painting by Antonio Joli, showing Charles leaving Naples to be crowned king of Spain after the death of his two elder brothers. It and its pair Charles III's Departure for Spain, Seen from the Sea are now in the National Museum of Capodimonte in Naples.

Bibliography
Mario Sapio, Il Museo di Capodimonte, Napoli, Arte'm, 2012. 
Touring Club Italiano, Museo di Capodimonte, Milano, Touring Club Editore, 2012. 

1759 paintings
Paintings in the collection of the Museo di Capodimonte